Braggins is a surname. Notable people with the surname include:

Dave Braggins (1945–2004), Canadian footballer
Dick Braggins (1879–1963), American baseball player